The CALFED Bay-Delta Program, also known as CALFED, is a department within the government of California, administered under the California Resources Agency. The department acts as consortium, coordinating the activities and interests of the state government of California and the U.S. federal government to focus on interrelated water problems in the state’s Sacramento-San Joaquin River Delta. The coordination program was created in 1994 by Governor Pete Wilson and federal Interior Secretary Bruce Babbitt following a decade of chaotic disputes between the state of California, the federal government, environmental groups, agricultural interests, and municipal water services.

The current Director of CALFED is Joe Grindstaff. The department is located along Capitol Mall in Sacramento.

Priorities
CALFED's priorities for the Sacramento-San Joaquin River Delta include:
To ensure the reliability of water supplies within the Delta.
To improve and safeguard the Delta's water quality. The Delta currently serves as the tap to 25 million Californians who receive at least some of their drinking water.
To restore the Delta's ecosystem by protecting native species and eradicating invasive species.
To improve levee protection along the Delta's rivers.

Coordinating agencies
Various federal and state agencies fall into CALFED's coordination authority. These agencies include:

State
California Resources Agency
California Bay-Delta Authority
California Department of Conservation
California Department of Fish and Game
California Department of Water Resources
California State Parks
Reclamation Board
Delta Protection Commission
San Francisco Bay Conservation and Development Commission
California Environmental Protection Agency
State Water Resources Control Board
California Department of Food and Agriculture
California Department of Health and Human Services
California Department of Public Health

Federal
U.S. Department of the Interior
U.S. Bureau of Reclamation
U.S. Fish and Wildlife Service
U.S. Geological Survey
U.S. Bureau of Land Management
U.S. Environmental Protection Agency
U.S. Department of Defense
U.S. Army Corps of Engineers
U.S. Department of Agriculture
Natural Resources Conservation Service
U.S. Forest Service
National Marine Fisheries Service
U.S. Department of Energy
Western Area Power Administration

In addition to the state and federal agencies, nearly 60 Native American tribes also participate in the program's activity coordination.

Criticisms
In February 2006, the California Legislative Analyst's Office, or LAO, published criticisms of the CALFED Program during its annual budget review, citing sources from the California State Legislature and various independent review panels. The LAO report indicated that CALFED had "[failed] to develop a viable long-term finance plan (as directed by the Legislature)," as well as its "lack of focus and priorities," and "lack of a performance orientation." Due to its various coordination agencies and priorities, the LAO declared that "the program had strayed from its original focus of resolving conflicts among water-related interests in the Delta, by expanding into what looked like a statewide water management program, resulting in substantial overlap with the mission and responsibilities of [the] California Department of Water Resources."

The LAO recommended to the Legislature and for Governor Arnold Schwarzenegger to reform CALFED by establishing realistic budget reviews and create more confined responsibilities that would not overlap into other departments.

See also

Sacramento River
San Joaquin River
Central Valley Project
California Water Fix and Eco Restore, formerly known as the Bay Delta Conservation Plan
California Water Wars

References

External links
Official CALFED Bay-Delta Program website

California Natural Resources Agency
State agencies of California
Sacramento–San Joaquin River Delta
San Francisco Bay watershed
Government agencies established in 1994
1994 establishments in California